Zinc finger protein 280B is a protein that in humans is encoded by the ZNF280B gene.

Function 

The protein encoded by this gene is a transcription factor that upregulates expression of MDM2, which negatively regulates p53 expression. This gene is highly expressed in prostate cancer cells, which leads to a reduction in p53 levels and an increase in growth of the cancer cells. Several transcript variants have been found for this gene, but only one of them is protein-coding.

References 

Human proteins